Santiago Apóstol is a 2017 Spain film directed by Alan Coton and it stars Julián Gil. The film is based on the life of Santiago Apóstol. It premiered on April 14, 2017 in Spain.

Plot 
The film is based on the life of the apostle Santiago, from his birth, his encounter with Jesus, his evangelization through Hispania, until his death in the year 44, and ends when his body arrives in Galicia.

Cast 
 Julián Gil as Santiago
 Jorge Aravena as Josías de Judá
 Alexis Ayala as Brujo Hermogenes
 Marcelo Córdoba as San Pedro
 Christian de la Campa as Torcuato Cansato
 Marco de Paula as Atanasio
 Scarlet Gruber as Princess Viria
 Roberto Manrique as San Juan
 Ana Obregón as Reina Loba
 Scarlet Ortiz as María de Nazareth
 Alex Sirvent as Teodoro
 Aroldo Betancourt as Fileto
 Ana Lorena Sánchez as María Magdalena
 Salvador Zerboni as Judas
 José Narváez as Jesus

References

External links